Variant objects in the context of HTTP are objects served by an Origin Content Server in a type of transmitted data variation (i.e. uncompressed, compressed, different languages, etc.).

HTTP/1.1 (1997–1999) introduces Content/Accept headers. These are used in HTTP requests and responses to state which variant the data is presented in.

Example Scenario
Client:
GET /encoded_data.html HTTP/1.1
Host: www.example.com
Accept-Encoding: gzip

Server:
HTTP/1.1 200 OK 
Server: http-example-server
Content-Length: 23
Content-Encoding: gzip

<23 bytes of gzip compressed data>

See also
 HTTP
 HTTP compression
 List of HTTP headers
 Web cache

References

External links
 How Apache handles content negotiation

Network protocols
Web browsers
Internet protocols
Application layer protocols
Open formats
World Wide Web Consortium standards